Racing Pride is a lesbian, gay, bisexual and transgender (LGBT) rights charity working in the motorsport industry to promote inclusivity across the sport, and amongst its technological and commercial partners.

The organisation was founded in 2019 in partnership with LGBT rights charity Stonewall.

Racing Pride has announced a number of Driver Ambassadors from across a range of motorsport disciplines to improve the visibility of LGBT people in the industry and to increase inclusivity amongst racing fans and organisers.

Those drivers who have already been announced as Racing Pride Ambassadors include Richard Morris, Charlie Martin, Sarah Moore and Abbie Eaton.

The organisation has also gone on to partner with a number of motorsport organisations, such as the British Automobile Racing Club, the British Racing and Sports Car Club, Formula Student and Team Parker Racing.

Partnership with Aston Martin F1

In June 2021, Racing Pride announced a partnership with Aston Martin F1 to hold a series of social and community initiatives to raise awareness of LGBTQ+ diversity and inclusion. Coinciding with Pride Month 2021, the collaboration also saw Racing Pride logos appear on the Aston Martin Formula One cars at the 2021 French Grand Prix.

Four time F1 Champion, and Aston Martin F1 driver Sebastian Vettel said of the partnership: "I want to help highlight the positivity around the message of inclusion and acceptance. I congratulate the people who have pushed the discussion that has led to wider inclusion; but, equally, I'm aware that more needs to be done to change attitudes and remove much of the remaining negativity. It is great to see Aston Martin Cognizant Formula One team giving this issue support - there is a long road ahead, but I'm really pleased we can play a positive role".

See also
 
 LGBT rights in the United Kingdom
 List of LGBT rights organisations

References

External links
Racing Pride official site
 

LGBT political advocacy groups in the United Kingdom
Organizations established in 2019